GNU Taler is a free software-based microtransaction and electronic payment system. Unlike most other decentralized payment systems, GNU Taler does not use a blockchain. A blind signature is used to protect the privacy of users as it prevents the exchange from knowing which coin it signed for which customer.

The project is led by Florian Dold and Christian Grothoff of Taler Systems SA. Taler is short for the "Taxable Anonymous Libre Economic Reserves" and alludes to the Taler coins in Germany during the Early Modern period. It has vocal support from GNU Project founder Richard Stallman. Stallman has described the program as "designed to be anonymous for the payer, but payees are always identified." In a paper published in Security, Privacy, and Applied Cryptography Engineering, GNU Taler is described as meeting ethical considerations – the paying customer is anonymous while the merchant is identified and taxable. An implementation is provided by Taler Systems SA.

See also 

 DigiCash
 Cryptocurrency
 Open source

References

External links
 

GNU Project software
Software using the GPL license
Payment systems
Online payments